Laevicaulis is a taxonomic genus of air-breathing, tropical land slugs, terrestrial pulmonate gastropod mollusks in the family Veronicellidae, the leatherleaf slugs.

Species
Species within the genus Laevicaulis include:
 Laevicaulis alte (Férussac, 1822)
 Laevicaulis giganteus (Godwin-Austen, 1895)
 Laevicaulis haroldi (Collinge, 1901) - Purcell's hunter slug
 Laevicaulis natalensis (F. Krauss, 1848)
 Laevicaulis somalicus (Colosi, 1927)
 Laevicaulis striatus (Simroth, 1896)
 Laevicaulis stuhlmanni (Simroth, 1895)
 Laevicaulis vosseleri (Simroth, 1913)
 Laevicaulis zanzibaricus Forcart, 1953
Species brought into synonymy
 Laevicaulis comorensis (P. Fischer, 1883): synonym of Laevicaulis alte (Férussac, 1822) (junior synonym)
 Laevicaulis maillardi (P. Fischer, 1871): synonym of Laevicaulis alte (Férussac, 1822) (junior synonym)
 Laevicaulis saxicolus (Cockerell, 1893): synonym of Laevicaulis natalensis natalensis (F. Krauss, 1848) (junior synonym)

References

 Grimpe G. & Hoffmann H. (1924). Diagnosen neuer Athoracophoriden (Gastr., Pulm.). Zoologischer Anzeiger. 58: 171-177
 Bank, R. A. (2017). Classification of the Recent terrestrial Gastropoda of the World. Last update: July 16th, 2017
 Forcart, L. (1969). Veronicellid land slugs from the New Hebrides, with description of Semperula solemi, new species. Fieldiana: Zoology, 50 (12): 147-156
page(s): 148; note: reversed priority of Laevicaulis (originally described as subgenus) and Eleutherocaulis (originally described as genus)

External links
 Simroth, H. (1913). Über die von Voeltzkow auf Madagascar und in Ostafrika erbeuteten Vaginuliden, nebst verwandtem Material von ganz Afrika. In: Voeltzkow, A. Reise in Ostafrika in den Jahren 1903–1905. Wissenschaftliche Ergebnisse. Band III. Systematische Arbeiten. Stuttgart: E. Schweizerbart'sche Verlagsbuchhandlung, pp.129–216

Veronicellidae
Taxonomy articles created by Polbot